The 1977–78 FA Cup was the 97th season of the world's oldest knockout football competition, The Football Association Challenge Cup, or FA Cup. The final saw Ipswich Town beat Arsenal 1–0, with a goal from Roger Osborne.

First round proper

Teams from the Football League Third and Fourth Division entered in this round plus Workington, Scarborough, Dagenham and Wycombe Wanderers were given byes. The first round of games were played on 26 November 1977. Replays were played mainly on 28–30 November, with three on 5 and 7 December.

Second round proper
The second round of games were played on 17 December 1977. Replays took place on 19th–21st.

Third round proper
Teams from the Football League First and Second Division entered in this round. The third round of games in the FA Cup were played on 6–7 January 1978. Replays were mainly played over 9–11 January but some occurred on 16th instead.

Fourth round proper
The fourth round of games were intended to be played on 28 January 1978, but by this time only nine matches had been played, of which three went to replays. The other matches and replays were completed either midweek on 31 January – 1 February, or on 6 February. Replays were played at various times after the initial games. Holders Manchester United were eliminated by West Bromwich Albion.

Fifth round proper
The fifth set of games mainly took place on 18 February 1978, with two of the games played on 22nd and 27th. Four games went to replays which were played on 27–28 February. A second replay was then played on 2 March.

Sixth round proper
The sixth round of FA Cup games were played on 11 March 1978. There was one replay on 14th.

Semi-finals

Final

TV Coverage

The domestic television rights were shared between BBC and ITV in a similar fashion to Football League matches. The final was the only match transmitted live and was shown on both on BBC1 & ITV. The BBC football highlights programme Match of the Day would show up to three games and the various ITV regional network stations would each show extended highlights from one match and shorter highlights from matches covered by other regions in the ITV network. No matches from the first two rounds were televised. Highlights of replays were shown on either the BBC or ITV. The BBC were only able to cover two planned Round Three FA Cup round ties due to a technical error for West Ham United v Watford. 

Third Round BBC Carlisle United v Manchester United, Leeds United v Manchester City, Manchester United v Carlisle United (Midweek replay). ITV Chelsea v Liverpool (LWT), Sheffield United v Arsenal (Yorkshire), Everton v Aston Villa (Granada & ATV), Middlesbrough v Coventry City (Tyne-Tees), Peterborough United v Newcastle United (Anglia) 

Fourth Round BBC Manchester United v West Bromwich Albion, Newcastle United v Wrexham, Arsenal v Wolverhampton Wanderers. ITV Middlesbrough v Everton (Tyne-Tees & Granada), West Ham United v Queens Park Rangers (LWT), Walsall v Leicester City (ATV), Bristol Rovers v Southampton (HTV & Southern), Nottingham Forest v Manchester City (Midweek All Regions) 

Fifth Round BBC Wrexham v Blyth Spartans, Queens Park Rangers v Nottingham Forest, Arsenal v Walsall. ITV Bristol Rovers v Ipswich Town (HTV & Anglia), Orient v Chelsea (LWT) All regions showed these two games. 

Sixth Round BBC West Bromwich Albion v Nottingham Forest, Millwall v Ipswich Town. ITV Wrexham v Arsenal (HTV, Granada & LWT), Middlesbrough v Orient (Tyne-Tees & Yorkshire) All regions showed these two games 

Semi-Finals BBC Ipswich Town v West Bromwich Albion. ITV Arsenal v Orient (All regions) 

Final Arsenal v Ipswich Town shown live on BBC and ITV.

See also
 1977–78 WFA Cup

References
 FA Cup Results Archive

 
FA Cup seasons
Fa
Eng